The 155th Regiment Illinois Volunteer Infantry was an infantry regiment that served in the Union Army during the American Civil War.

Service
The 155th Illinois Infantry was organized at Camp Butler, Illinois,    and mustered into Federal service on February 28, 1865, for a one-year enlistment.  The 155th served in garrisons along the line of the Nashville and Chattanooga Railroad

The regiment mustered out September 4, 1865.

Total strength and casualties 
The regiment suffered 71 enlisted men who died of disease for a total of 71 fatalities.

Commanders
Colonel Gustavus A. Smith - mustered out with the regiment.

See also
List of Illinois Civil War Units
Illinois in the American Civil War

Notes

References
The Civil War Archive

Units and formations of the Union Army from Illinois
Military units and formations established in 1865
1865 establishments in Illinois
Military units and formations disestablished in 1865